Rhinoceps is a genus of thrips in the family Phlaeothripidae.

Species
 Rhinoceps flavipes
 Rhinoceps jansei
 Rhinoceps tapanti

References

Phlaeothripidae
Thrips
Thrips genera